Seven Night Stand was a concert residency by American rock band No Doubt, performed at Gibson Amphitheatre in Los Angeles, California, United States.

Set list
"Push and Shove"
"It's My Life"
"Hella Good"
"Underneath It All"
"Ex-Girlfriend"
"Hey Baby"
"New"
"Hey You!"
"Sparkle"
"Simple Kind of Life"
"One More Summer"
"Sunday Morning"
"Bathwater"
"Settle Down"
"Don't Speak"
"Just a Girl"
Encore
"Guns Of Navarone"
"Looking Hot"
"Excuse Me Mr."
"Total Hate 95"
"Spiderwebs"

Shows

References 

2012 concert residencies
No Doubt concert tours
2012 in California